The 2017–18 Texas–Rio Grande Valley Vaqueros women's basketball team represented the University of Texas Rio Grande Valley during the 2017–18 NCAA Division I women's basketball season. This was head coach Larry Tidwell's fifth season along with the third under the UTRGV label. The Vaqueros played their home games at the UTRGV Fieldhouse and were members of the Western Athletic Conference. The team finished seventh in the WAC after going 4–10 while finishing 14–16 overall.

On April 21, 2018 Tidwell resigned from his position to accept the job for the Chief of Staff for the women's basketball program at Texas Tech. He finished at UTRGV with a 5 year record of 85–75

Roster

Schedule

|-
!colspan=9 style="background:#; color:white;"| Non-conference regular season

|-
!colspan=9 style="background:#; color:white;"| WAC regular season

|-
!colspan=9 style="background:#; color:white;"| WAC Women's Tournament

See also
2017–18 Texas–Rio Grande Valley Vaqueros men's basketball team

References 

UT Rio Grande Valley Vaqueros women's basketball seasons
Texas-Rio Grande Valley